Henrik Ripszám (1 February 1889 – 9 December 1976) was a Hungarian long-distance runner. He competed in the marathon and the 10km walk at the 1912 Summer Olympics.

References

1889 births
1976 deaths
Athletes (track and field) at the 1912 Summer Olympics
Hungarian male long-distance runners
Hungarian male racewalkers
Hungarian male marathon runners
Olympic athletes of Hungary
Athletes from Budapest
Hungarian artists